The 1884 United States presidential election in New York took place on November 4, 1884. All contemporary 38 states were part of the 1884 United States presidential election. Voters chose 36 electors to the Electoral College, which selected the president and vice president.

New York was won by the Democratic nominees, Governor Grover Cleveland of New York and his running mate former Senator and Governor Thomas A. Hendricks of Indiana. Cleveland and Hendricks defeated the Republican nominees, former Secretary of State and Senator James G. Blaine of Maine and his running mate Senator John A. Logan of Illinois. 

Cleveland narrowly carried New York State with a plurality of 48.25 percent of the vote to Blaine's 48.15 percent, a victory margin of 0.10 percent. In a distant third came the Prohibition Party candidate John St. John with 2.14 percent, while Greenback Party candidate Benjamin Butler came in fourth, with 1.46 percent. 

New York weighed in for this election as less than 1 percentage point more Republican than the national average. 

Cleveland's narrow victory in his home state, with its 36 electoral votes, proved decisive in clinching him the 1884 election and allowing him to win the presidency. He won despite strong opposition to Cleveland from the corrupt Tammany Hall machine, which held significant influence over New York's politics.

Cleveland performed most strongly downstate in the New York City area, where he won New York County, Kings County, Queens County, and received over 60% of the vote in Richmond County. Cleveland also won nearby Suffolk County, Westchester County, and Rockland County. Blaine won much of upstate New York, including a victory in Erie County, home to the city of Buffalo, although Cleveland did manage to win Albany County, home to the state capital of Albany, along with several rural upstate counties.

Results

Results by county

See also
 Grover Cleveland's first term as President of the United States

References

New York
1884
1884 New York (state) elections